Jorge Manuel Guerreiro Soares (born 22 October 1971) is a Portuguese retired footballer who played as a central defender.

He amassed Primeira Liga totals of 273 games and 11 goals over the course of 13 seasons, representing mainly in the competition Farense and Marítimo.

Club career
Born in the village of Messejana in Aljustrel, Beja, Soares joined S.C. Farense at the age of 15, being first-choice with the first team in his last four years, all spent in the Primeira Liga. In the 1994–95 season he scored a career-best three goals in 26 games to help the club qualify to the UEFA Cup for the first time in its history; late into the following campaign he notably found the net in a 1–0 away win against S.L. Benfica, who subsequently signed him.

During his two-year spell with them, Soares partnered Jorge Bermúdez, Hélder Cristóvão or Tahar El Khalej in the heart of the defense, becoming first-choice after the second moved to Deportivo de La Coruña in the winter transfer season of 1996. In a match against FC Porto on 11 January 1997, however, he was unsuccessful at blocking a cross directed towards Mário Jardel, who stopped it with his chest and scored his team's first in an eventual 2–1 success in Lisbon. After being released he represented C.S. Marítimo in the top flight, C.F. União in the second division and Louletano D.C. in the lower leagues, retiring in 2008 at 36.

International career
Soares amassed 7 caps for the under–21, playing in the 1992 Toulon Tournament, helping his nation win the competition.

References

External links

1971 births
Living people
People from Aljustrel
Portuguese footballers
Association football defenders
Primeira Liga players
Liga Portugal 2 players
Segunda Divisão players
S.C. Farense players
S.L. Benfica footballers
C.S. Marítimo players
C.F. União players
Louletano D.C. players
Portugal under-21 international footballers
Sportspeople from Beja District